John Paul Cain (January 14, 1936 – March 20, 2017) was an American professional golfer who played on the Senior PGA Tour.

Cain was born and raised in Sweetwater, Texas. He attended Texas Tech University and was a member of the golf team from 1955–1956 and 1958–1959. He helped the Red Raiders win the last two Border Conference championships in 1955  and 1956. In 1959, Cain helped the team win the Southwest Conference championship and place fifth in the NCAA Championship.

Cain worked as a stockbroker in Houston until turning professional in 1988 at the age of 52. He won his first tournament a year later at the Greater Grand Rapids Open, becoming only the second Monday qualifier (after Larry Mowry) to win a Senior PGA Tour event. In 1994, Cain, playing as a sponsor's exemption, earned his second Senior Tour title at the Ameritech Senior Open by one stroke over Jim Colbert and Simon Hobday, both of whom had also finished at T-2 the previous year.

Cain is a member of the Texas Golf Hall of Fame.

Amateur wins (1)
1959 Texas State Amateur

Professional wins (2)

Senior PGA Tour wins (2)

Senior PGA Tour playoff record (0–1)

References

External links

American male golfers
Texas Tech Red Raiders men's golfers
PGA Tour Champions golfers
Golfers from Texas
People from Sweetwater, Texas
1936 births
2017 deaths